Coat of arms of Macedonia may refer to:

 Coat of arms of Macedonia (region) - early modern coats of arms of the historical region of Macedonia
 Coat of arms of North Macedonia - official national emblem of modern North Macedonia
 Proposed coat of arms of North Macedonia - various propositions for new emblem of North Macedonia
 Coat of arms of the President of North Macedonia - presidential emblem of North Macedonia

See also
 Macedonia (disambiguation)